Nick Macer from Stroud is best known as a specialist nurseryman and owner of Pan Global Plants, Gloucestershire, UK, but also as a presenter on BBC's regular gardening show, Gardeners World, where he looked at gardens specializing in hardy exotics during the autumn of 2016.

After, in his own words, a 'rebellious youth', he took a three-year course in arboriculture at Merrist Wood College. Then with a bank loan he started Pan-global Plants in 1997, now based in Frampton-on-Severn. He has travelled the world to find plants for his unique nursery which supplies plants to many significant gardens throughout the UK including the RHS, National Trust and Buckingham Palace.

References

External links
 http://www.panglobalplants.co.uk/

Living people
English horticulturists
Year of birth missing (living people)